Stoll is a surname. Notable people with the surname include:
 Barbara J. Stoll, American pediatrician and professor
 Cal Stoll, American football coach
 Caroline Stoll
 Caspar Stoll, entomologist
 Clifford Stoll, American astronomer
 David Stoll, American anthropologist
 Elmo Stoll (1944–1998) Amish bishop and writer
 Gloria Stoll Karn (1923–2022), American graphic artist born Glora Stoll 
 Günther Stoll, German television actor
 Hermann Stoll, German geologist and prehistorian
 Inge Stoll, German motorcycle racer
 Ira Stoll, American journalist
 Jack Stoll (born 1998), American football player
 James Stoll, Unitarian Universalist minister
 Jarret Stoll, Canadian ice hockey player
 Jon Stoll, founder and president of Fantasma Productions
 Maximilian Stoll (1742–1787), Austrian physician
 Michael Stoll, American economist
 Oswald Stoll, British founder of the Stoll Moss theatre group
 Otto Stoll (1849–1922), Swiss linguist and ethnologist
 Pablo Stoll, Uruguayan film director 
 Paul Michael Stoll (born 1985), American-Mexican basketball player
 Randy Stoll

 Willi-Peter Stoll, German terrorist (Red Army Faction)

See also
 Stoll Pictures, a British film company of the silent era
 Stoll, Kentucky, unincorporated community
 Stoll kidnapping, 1934 kidnapping
 Stol (disambiguation)
 Stole (disambiguation)
 Stolle, a surname